Petersberg may refer to:

 The Hotel Petersberg near Bonn, the site of the
 Petersberg Agreement, 1949, regarding the international status of West Germany.
 Petersberg tasks, 1992 and 1997, regarding European security cooperation. Also known as "Petersburg Missions" or "Petersberg Objectives".
 Petersberg Declaration
 Municipalities in Germany:
 Petersberg, Hesse, in the district of Fulda, Hesse
 Petersberg, Rhineland-Palatinate, in the district Südwestpfalz, Rhineland-Palatinate
 Götschetal-Petersberg, collective municipality in the district Saalekreis, Saxony-Anhalt
 Petersberg, Saxony-Anhalt, in Götschetal-Petersberg
 Petersberg, Thuringia, in the district Saale-Holzland, Thuringia
 German name of Sânpetru, Brașov, Romania
 Hills and mountains in Germany:
 Petersberg in Götschetal-Petersberg
 Petersberg in Erfurt, site of the Petersberg Citadel
 Petersberg (Flintsbach) or The Madron, Flintsbach, Bavaria, site of St. Peter's Abbey on the Madron
 Petersberg, Halle, a hill near Halle, Saxony-Anhalt
 Heisterbach Abbey, also Petersthal, formerly Petersberg, near Oberdollendorf, after which the Hotel Petersberg is named

See also

 Peterborough (disambiguation)
 Petersburg (disambiguation)
 Saint Petersburg (disambiguation)
 Peters (disambiguation)
 Peter (disambiguation)